Deep River is a tributary of the Cape Fear River, approximately  long, in north central North Carolina in the United States. Deep River is a translation of the Indian name sapponah, "deep river".

Paddling is popular on the river. Deep River is flanked by the planned Deep River State Trail and several other parks and preservation areas including Carbonton Dam Park, House in the Horseshoe Historic Site, Deep River Park and Deep River Camelback Truss Bridge, Endor Iron Furnace, White Pines Nature Preserve, Lockville Dam, Canal and Powerhouse, and Mermaid Point.

The Cape Fear shiner, a critically endangered minnow, inhabits the river.

Course 

Deep River rises in the Piedmont country in western Guilford County, east of Kernersville. It flows southeast past High Point and Randleman, forming the Randleman Lake. It passes northeast of Asheboro, then flows east to Franklinville then to Ramseur, then passing north of Sanford. The Rocky River enters the Deep River at the White Pines Nature Preserve. Deep River joins Haw River at Mermaid Point near Moncure to form the Cape Fear River.

Dams 

The river crosses the Fall Line of North Carolina, an area where rivers are quite rocky and have a moderately high gradient. This gradient was used to power mills along the river to support the early textile industry in North Carolina. The river, popular with canoeists, was a center of a great deal of activity during the American Revolution at places such as Franklinville and the House In The Horseshoe.

The Lockville Dam, built of stone, is the only portion of the 19th-century Deep River lock and dam system that remains today.

In the fall of 2005, the dam was removed for the purpose of creating environmental mitigation credit by Restoration Systems, LLC, a leading environmental mitigation company in North Carolina. The project restored  of the former impoundment around the House in the Horseshoe to free-flowing river.

Tributaries

References

Rivers of North Carolina
Rivers of Chatham County, North Carolina
Rivers of Guilford County, North Carolina
Rivers of Lee County, North Carolina
Rivers of Moore County, North Carolina
Rivers of Randolph County, North Carolina